Alejandro Gándara (born 1957) is a Spanish writer. Born in Santander, Cantabria, Gandara studied political science and sociology at Complutense University in Madrid, where he also now teaches. He won the Premio Ignacio Aldecoa for short stories in 1979, and published his first novel La media distancia in 1984. He has published more than a dozen volumes of fiction and non-fiction, and his work has been translated into English, German and Italian among other languages. 

Gandara won the Premio Nadal for his novel Ciegas esperanzas and the Premio Herralde for Últimas noticias de nuestro mundo. He is a regular contributor to newspapers and magazines, including El Pais and El Mundo.

References

1957 births
Living people
20th-century Spanish novelists
21st-century Spanish novelists
Complutense University of Madrid
Complutense University of Madrid alumni
People from Santander, Spain